Lawerence Denney is an American  politician who served as the secretary of state of Idaho. A Republican, Denney previously served as a member of the Idaho House of Representatives, including three terms as Speaker of the Idaho House of Representatives.

Political career
In 2006, Denney was elected Speaker of the Idaho House of Representatives and reelected in 2008 and 2010. Denny was defeated in his reelection bid for speaker in 2012 by fellow Republican Scott Bedke.

In the 2014 Idaho elections, Denney ran for the Republican nomination to succeed Ben Ysursa as Secretary of State of Idaho. He defeated former State Senator Evan Frasure, Ada County Chief Deputy Clerk Phil McGrane, and former State Senator Mitch Toryanski in the primary election. Denney defeated Democratic state representative Holli Woodings in the general election.

On April 19, 2017, Denney announced that he plans on seeking re-election. He is not running for reelection in 2022.

Personal

Denney has a bachelor's degree from the University of Idaho. He has been a farmer since 1972.

Electoral history

Sources
Lawerence Denney's campaign website
Lawerence Denney at the Idaho House of Representatives

References

|-

|-

21st-century American politicians
Farmers from Idaho
Living people
People from Council, Idaho
Secretaries of State of Idaho
Speakers of the Idaho House of Representatives
Republican Party members of the Idaho House of Representatives
University of Idaho alumni
Year of birth missing (living people)